Arev Monthly (أريف in Arabic, meaning sun in Armenian) was a monthly published in Cairo, Egypt by the Armenian daily Arev in Arabic covering Armenian subjects and concentrating on Arab-Armenian relations. 

It was established in 1997. The editor-in-chief was Mohammed Refaat el Immam. The monthly stopped publication in April 2009 after 12 years and 136 monthly issues. In April 2010, a very similar publication, Arek was launched with Mohammed Refaat el Imam as editor-in-chief.

See also
 List of magazines in Egypt

References

External links
Archive of Arev Monthly

1997 establishments in Egypt
2009 disestablishments in Egypt
Arabic-language magazines
Armenian diaspora in Egypt
Defunct magazines published in Egypt
Magazines established in 1997
Magazines disestablished in 2009
Magazines published in Cairo
Monthly magazines published in Egypt